The Nick Prevost House was a residence in Anderson, South Carolina. Built in 1877 by Nick Prevost, a local entrepreneur, it was listed on the National Register of Historic Places in 1984, but was taken off the list in 2005 after it was demolished. The house is described as an early example of Neoclassical Revival architecture. The design was based on a house exhibited at the 1876 Centennial Exposition in Philadelphia. The one-story three bay wood-frame house had simulated wood quoins at the corners and an arcaded porch across the front.  The porch featured segmental arches on Doric columns. The roof was flat, with a balustrade matching that on the porch.

References

External links

Houses on the National Register of Historic Places in South Carolina
Renaissance Revival architecture in South Carolina
Houses completed in 1920
Houses in Anderson County, South Carolina
National Register of Historic Places in Anderson County, South Carolina
Historic American Buildings Survey in South Carolina
Former National Register of Historic Places in South Carolina
Demolished buildings and structures in South Carolina